Elamkunnapuzha  is a village in Ernakulam district in the Indian state of Kerala.

Demographics
 India census, Elamkunnapuzha had a population of 26092 with 12572 males and 13520 females.

Education
 Government Arts and Science College, Vypin

References

Villages in Ernakulam district